The London Institute (officially the London Institute for Mathematical Sciences) is an independent research organisation in London that conducts research in physics, mathematics and the theoretical sciences. The Institute does not do experiments. It does not award degrees and there are no teaching or administrative duties.

History 
The London Institute was founded in 2011 when it became a registered charity. It was conceived as a research centre where scientists could focus full-time on fundamental theoretical research, unencumbered by teaching and other duties. Its first research grant was from the Defense Advanced Research Projects Agency. In 2015 it became eligible for funding from the EU scientific research agency. 

In 2019, the London Institute was awarded Independent Research Organisation status by the Engineering and Physical Sciences Research Council. It is the UK's first private research centre in the physical sciences to be allowed to compete with universities for funding from the seven Research Councils.

The Institute previously occupied a Grade II* listed Georgian townhouse in Mayfair, London. In 2021, the Institute moved into rooms at the Royal Institution of Great Britain, where Sir Humphry Davy identified nine new elements in the periodic table and Michael Faraday uncovered the fundamental principles of electromagnetism.

Organisation 
The Director of the London Institute is the physicist Thomas Fink. Its Board of Trustees includes Sir Roy Anderson, FRS, former chief scientist at the Ministry of Defence; Sir John Beddington, FRS, recently the UK government's chief scientific adviser; and Martin Reeves, Global Director at Boston Consulting Group.

Former members of the Board of Trustees include Sir Peter Williams, FRS; Baroness Meyer; physicist Luciano Pietronero; Dame Shirley Porter; and physicist Tom Tombrello.

Scientists and non-scientists are not segregated but work closely together, so everyone is involved in funding, carrying out and communicating discoveries.

Their ethos that the communication of discoveries is as important as making them manifests in their award-nominated web design. In early 2022, the Institute’s website received one of five Webby Award Nominations for the best science website, alongside NASA and Science magazine.

Research 
The London Institute does research in theoretical physics and mathematics. It does not have laboratories and does not conduct experiments. The Institute is committed to basic research as this has historically led to the most far-reaching breakthroughs, such as gravity and electromagnetism. Research at the London Institute spans five themes: Mathematics that unifies; The elegant universe; Life, learning and emergence; Tomorrow’s technology; and the Theory of human enterprise.

In early 2021, the UK government announced the launch of its new science agency, ARIA, to support projects that may create "a paradigm shift in science". As a roadmap for the new agency, the London Institute compiled a list of the 23 Mathematical Challenges of our time. Inspired by David Hilbert’s list of 23 challenges, 17 of which have been solved or partially resolved, the new list was intended by the Institute as a reminder to itself and others to aim high. It was published in full in The Times.

In an article in The Spectator in 2021, the Institute outlined the areas of research it is working on, which comprise the "challenges of tomorrow, for which we must find solutions today". These include teaching computers to uncover new theorems; identifying the mathematical structure of innovation; making neural computing practicable; building a platform for collective creativity; harvesting energy from fluctuations in the environment; and unravelling ageing and mortality.

Funding 
The London Institute is funded by research grants from the EU's Horizon 2020, the European Innovation Council, DARPA, the US Department of Defense, the Ministry of Defence, the Medical Research Council and Cancer Research UK. Industry collaborations include investments from firms in strategy, biotech and AI.  The London Institute has partnered with over 50 research organisations from around the world. 
 
With the expansion of the development team in 2021, the Institute added philanthropic gifts to its funding sources. In 2022 donors helped launch the Arnold and Landau Fellowships, created to support Russian, Ukrainian, and Belarusian scientists affected by the Russian invasion of Ukraine.

Events 
In October 2021, London Institute Fellows Thomas Fink and Yang-Hui He spoke to Nobel Laureate Sir Roger Penrose in the Royal Institution's Lecture Theatre about his life and work. In December 2021, Professor He delivered a lecture in the Royal Institution's theatre, presenting a talk about the Theory of Everything.

In March 2022, Dr Mark Kotter, whose company bit.bio collaborates with the Institute, spoke in the Lecture Theatre about the cell programming revolution.

References

External links 
 London Institute for Mathematical Sciences

Education in London
History of science and technology in England
Science and technology in London